Mukhammas (Arabic مخمس 'fivefold') refers to a type of Persian or Urdu cinquain or pentastich with Sufi connections based on a pentameter. And have five lines in each paragraph.

It is one of the more popular verse forms in Tajik Badakhshan, occurring both in madoh and in other performance-genres.

Details of the form
The mukhammas represents a stanza of two distichs and a hemistich in monorhyme, the fifth line being the "bob" or burden: each succeeding stanza affects a new rhyme, except in the fifth line, e.g., a rhyme scheme of AAAAB CCCCB DDDDB and so forth.

Every stanza of a mukhammas includes five lines. 
In the first stanza, all five lines rhyme. 
In the later stanzas, the first four lines rhyme, but the fifth line breaks the rhyme. It can be repeated, or else its rhyme can be that of the first stanza.

Themes
A recurrent theme of the mukhammas is praise of Imam Ali and his companions but other themes also occur.

Poets
Many Urdu poets have contributed to the mukhammas. The important among them include:
Mirza Ghalib
Bahadur Shah Zafar
Wali Mohammed Wali
Zauq

Poets who have written the mukhammas in other languages include:
Sipandi Samarkandi
Qatran Tabrizi

See also
Musaddas
Doha
Marsia
Masnavi
Rekhta

References

Urdu-language poetry
Poetic rhythm
Pakistani poetics